Liberty is an American silent two-reeler film, directed by Leo McCarey starring comedy duo Laurel and Hardy. It was released by Metro-Goldwyn-Mayer on January 26, 1929.

Plot
Stan and Ollie are prison escapees running down the road with a police officer firing a shotgun at them. They meet up with two accomplices in a car and, in their haste to change into street clothes, they wind up wearing each other's pants. Tossing their prison uniforms out the window, they attract the attention of a motorcycle police officer, but get out of the car without him seeing. They go looking for places to swap pants: the alley where a cop is grabbing a smoke and a lady screams at the sight of them; behind some crates with another cop nearby; and behind a seafood shop, where a crab accidentally finds its way into Stan's trousers, causing him problems with nipping. Not paying attention to where they are going, Ollie topples a record player outside a music shop as records cover the sidewalk and the owner is not amused. A cop chases the boys to a construction site, where they evade him by riding an elevator to the top floor of an unfinished building. Atop the girders, 20 stories in the air, they finally switch trousers, contend with the crab, and nearly fall to their death a few dozen times. Finally, they manage to catch the next elevator, reach the ground safely, and make their getaway, failing to notice the cop who has been squashed into a dwarf by their elevator.

Cast

References

External links 

1929 films
1929 comedy films
American silent short films
American black-and-white films
Films about prison escapes
Films directed by Leo McCarey
Laurel and Hardy (film series)
Metro-Goldwyn-Mayer short films
Films with screenplays by H. M. Walker
1929 short films
American comedy short films
1920s American films
Silent American comedy films